The Honey Moon is a play by John Tobin.

History
It premiered at the Theatre Royal, Drury Lane, on 31 January 1805; Maria Rebecca Davison played Juliana. It opened in Edinburgh on 14 November 1809, with Henry Siddons playing the Duke.  It was revived at Drury Lane on 30 June 1827.

Plot
It was set in Spain in the early 17th century.

Bibliography

References

1805 plays
Plays by John Tobin
West End plays